Shaun Sarrett (born December 24, 1979) is an American football coach who is currently the assistant offensive line coach for the Los Angeles Chargers of the National Football League (NFL). Sarrett was most recently the offensive line coach for the Pittsburgh Steelers. He previously served as an assistant coach for Marshall and Duke before joining the Steelers as an offensive assistant in 2012. He played college football at Kent State.

Personal life and playing career  
A native of Beckley, West Virginia, Sarrett played guard at Kent State University. He earned the nickname "Sweet Feet" after a teammate at Kent State noticed that his footwork was above average. He graduated from Kent State in 2004 with a degree in health education.

Coaching career  
After his playing career at Kent State, Sarrett received no offers to play pro football, so he decided to pursue a coaching career. He began at Streetsboro High School, a high school less than seven miles away from Kent State coaching the offensive and defensive line as well as the co-strength coach. He spent one season in that role before joining the coaching staff at Marshall in 2005, working with the defensive line as the defensive quality control and graduate assistant before switching to a graduate assistant on offense in 2006. He was hired to work at Duke in 2008 on David Cutcliffe's staff as an offensive quality control working with the offensive line.  

Sarrett was hired by the Pittsburgh Steelers in 2012 as an offensive assistant. He was hired by Steelers head coach Mike Tomlin after his interview where former Kent State teammate and Steelers linebacker James Harrison recognized him and asked "What are you doing here, Sweet Feet?". He was promoted to assistant offensive line coach in 2018, and offensive line coach in 2019 after Mike Munchak left to join the Denver Broncos coaching staff. Sarrett's contract was not renewed after the 2020 season.

References

External links  
 Duke Blue Devils bio

1979 births
Living people
Sportspeople from Beckley, West Virginia
American football offensive guards
Kent State Golden Flashes football players
High school football coaches in Ohio
Marshall Thundering Herd football coaches
Duke Blue Devils football coaches
Pittsburgh Steelers coaches
Los Angeles Chargers coaches
Woodrow Wilson High School (Beckley, West Virginia) alumni